Robert Allison (3 December 1895 – 19 November 1948) was an Australian rules footballer who played with South Melbourne in the Victorian Football League (VFL).

Notes

External links 
		

1895 births
1948 deaths
Australian rules footballers from Melbourne
Sydney Swans players
Port Melbourne Football Club players
People from Albert Park, Victoria